is a Japanese politician of the Liberal Democratic Party and a member of the House of Representatives in the Diet (national legislature).

Early life
A native of Takayama, Gifu and graduate of Keio University, his father is former minister of finance, Ippei Kaneko.

Career
Kaneko was elected to the Diet for the first time in 1986. In September 2008 he was appointed Ministry of Land, Infrastructure, Transport and Tourism and succeeded Nariaki Nakayama in the post.

References

External links 
 Official website in Japanese.

1942 births
Living people
Keio University alumni
People from Gifu Prefecture
Liberal Democratic Party (Japan) politicians
Ministers of Land, Infrastructure, Transport and Tourism of Japan
Members of the House of Representatives (Japan)
21st-century Japanese politicians